Eduardo Vélez (born 20 April 1969) is a former professional tennis player from Mexico.

Biography
Vélez, who comes from Monterrey, attended Cardinal Gibbons High School in Fort Lauderdale and trained at the local tennis academy run by Gary Kesl. He won the Junior Orange Bowl (Under 14s) in 1983 and was the Mexican junior champion in 1984. A Mexican Davis Cup squad member, he twice made the boys' singles final at the Wimbledon Championships. He defeated Javier Sánchez to win the 1986 Wimbledon Championships, the second successive time a Mexican won the title, as he was beaten in the final the previous year by countryman Leonardo Lavalle.

After his success at Wimbledon, Vélez played in the main draw of two Grand Prix tournaments, the U.S. Pro Tennis Championships in Boston and the Washington DC Tennis Classic. In 1987, he played in the main draw of the Bristol Open; then in 1988, he featured at the Livingston Open, where he lost in the first round to Andre Agassi. He also competed on the Challenger circuit and in 1988 won a title in Acapulco. His 1989 season was ruined by injury, he had to undergo surgery on his knee cap and soon after hurt his back. In 1990, he qualified for the Canadian Open, a top tier event part of the ATP Championship Series. He defeated Dan Goldie in the first round, before losing in the second round to ninth seed David Wheaton.

Junior Grand Slam finals

Singles: 2 (1 title, 1 runner-up)

References

External links
 
 

1969 births
Living people
Mexican male tennis players
Wimbledon junior champions
Sportspeople from Monterrey
Mexican expatriates in the United States
Grand Slam (tennis) champions in boys' singles